The 2005 season of the Bhutanese A-Division was the eleventh recorded season of top-flight football in Bhutan. The league was won by Transport United, their second title in a row. As a result, they qualified as Bhutan's representatives in the 2006 AFC President's Cup.

League table
Teams played each other on a home and away basis, with the bottom two teams qualifying for a relegation playoff against the top two teams from the B-Division.

Relegation playoffs
Choden won the final of the B-Division on 19 June 2005, beating Rookies 3-0. Choden and another unknown team then entered the playoffs against Rigzhung and Dzongric. From the known fixtures that took place in 2006, it can be extrapolated that Choden beat Dzongric, whilst Rigzhung beat the other unknown team from the B-Division.

References

Bhutan A-Division seasons
Bhutan
Bhutan
1